Tubularia indivisa, or oaten pipes hydroid, is a species of large hydroid native to the northeastern Atlantic Ocean, the North Sea, Norwegian Sea, and the English Channel. They may be fused to a small number of other individual stems at their bases. The pinkish to red polyps resemble flowers, having two concentric rings of tentacles, with the outer rings being paler and longer than the inner ring. At the center is a pale pink gonotheca. They are preyed upon by nudibranchs.

Distribution 
A common species on coasts of the British Isles and adjacent parts of the north-east Atlantic Ocean.

References

External links
 

Tubulariidae
Animals described in 1758
Taxa named by Carl Linnaeus